Condo  is a surname. Notable people with the surname include:

 A.D. Condo (1872 – 1956), American cartoonist
 Ray Condo (1950 – 2004), Canadian rockabilly singer, saxophonist and guitarist
 George Condo (born 1957), American visual artist who works in painting, drawing, sculpture and printmaking
 Joseph P. Condo (1848 – 1923), American politician
 Jon Condo (born 1981), former American football long snapper

See also 

 Condo (disambiguation)
 Kondo